Cheng Tang, personal name Zi Lü, recorded on oracle bones as Da Yi (大乙), was the first king of the Shang dynasty in Chinese history. Traditionally considered a virtuous ruler, he overthrew Jie, the last ruler of the Xia dynasty.

Rise of Shang
Tang ruled Shang, one of the many kingdoms under the suzerainty of the Xia dynasty, for 17 years. During Jie's reign, Shang grew in power, initially at the expense of Xia's other vassals. He was able to win many supporters from as many as 40 smaller kingdoms. Tang recognized that Jie mistreated his people and used this to convince others. In one speech, Tang said that creating chaos was not something he wanted, but given the terror of Jie, he had to follow the Mandate of Heaven and use this opportunity to overthrow Xia. As an advantage he pointed out that even Jie's own military generals would not obey his orders.

In the 15th year of Jie's reign, Tang began moving Lü to the capital Bo. About two years later Shang sent his minister Yi Yin as an envoy to Jie. Yi remained in the Xia capital for about three years, before returning to Shang.

The Shang's power continued to grow. In the 26th year of Jie's reign, Shang conquered Wen. Two years later, Shang was attacked by Kunwu, and several years of war between Shang and Kunwu followed. Despite this setback, Shang continued to expand on a number of fronts, gathering vassal troops in Jingbo. The Shang army and allied forces conquered Mitxu (today's Xinmi in Henan), Wei, and attacked Gu, which too was conquered the following year. About this time Zhong Gu, chief historian of Jie, would flee from the Xia to the Shang.

Battle of Mingtiao
The Shang army fought against Jie's Xia forces at Mingtiao (鳴條) in a heavy thunderstorm and defeated them.

Jie himself escaped and fled to Sanzong. The Shang forces under their general Wuzi pursued Jie to Cheng, captured him at Jiaomen, and deposed him, bringing the Xia dynasty to an end. Eventually, Jie was exiled in Nanchao. Jie would eventually die of illness and Tang succeeded him as paramount King, inaugurating the Shang dynasty.

King of the Shang
Tang's reign was regarded as a good one by the Chinese. He lowered taxes and the conscription rate of soldiers. His influence spread to the Yellow River, and many outlying tribes, such as Di and Qiang, became vassal states. He also established Anyang as the new capital of China.

According to the Bamboo Annals, Tang built a palace called Xia She (夏社) to memorialize the Xia dynasty. In the first five years of his reign, there were several droughts. Tang ordered golden coins to be made and distributed to poor families who had been forced to sell their children because of the drought. It was intended for them to use this money to buy their children back.

According to the Bamboo Annals, in the 9th year of his reign, he moved the Nine Tripod Cauldrons, made by Yu the Great, to the Shang Palace.

References

Further reading
 

Shang dynasty kings
17th-century BC births
Xia dynasty people
Founding monarchs